Rieker is a surname. Notable people with the surname include:

Albert Rieker (1889–1959), German-born American sculptor
Manfred Rieker (born 1939), German photographer and photo designer
Morten Rieker (born 1940), Norwegian sailor
Rich Rieker (born 1961), American baseball umpire